Edmund Parr (March 30, 1849 – March 17, 1925) was an American Republican politician who served as a member of the Virginia House of Delegates and Senate, representing his native Patrick County.

References

External links
 
 

1849 births
1925 deaths
Republican Party members of the Virginia House of Delegates
Republican Party Virginia state senators
People from Patrick County, Virginia
20th-century American politicians
19th-century American politicians